Dysgonia mandschuriana is a moth of the family Noctuidae first described by Staudinger in 1892. It is found in China, Japan (Honshu, Kyushu), Korea (North, Central, South, Jeju Island) and the Russian Far East (the Primorye region).

References

External links

Dysgonia
Insects of Korea